Harry Booth (born in London, England) is a film director, film producer, screenwriter and editor. He began his film career in 1941.

He debuted as a director with the war documentary Blitz on Britain (1960). His subsequent films include A King's Story (1965), which was nominated for an Academy Award.

Booth's work on television includes directing 14 episodes of Here Come the Double Deckers (1970-1971), a children's series.

Filmography

Director
Ben Hall TV series (unknown episodes; 1975)
Op de Hollandse toer – English title Going Dutch (1973)
The Flying Sorcerer (1973)
The Protectors (1 TV episode; 1973)
Go for a Take – U.S. title Double Take (also credited as writer; 1972)
Mutiny on the Buses (1972)
On the Buses (1971)
Here Come the Double Deckers (14 TV episodes; 1970–1971)
River Rivals (1967)
A King's Story (1965)
The Sentimental Agent (1 TV episode; 1963)
Man of the World (5 TV episodes; 1962–1963)
The Adventures of Sir Francis Drake (3 TV episodes; 1961)

Editorial department
Rockshow assistant editor (1980)
The Avengers post-production coordinator (12 TV episodes; 1968–1969)
Visit to Spain supervising editor (TV episode; 1962)

Sound department
Robin Hood: The Movie dubbing editor (video; 1991)

Writer
At the Stroke of Nine (1957)
The Case of the Mukkinese Battle Horn (1956)

Editor
Crosstrap (1962)
Blitz on Britain (1960)
Penny Points to Paradise (1951)

Composer
International Detective TV series (unknown episodes; 1959)

References

External links

Bachelor of Arts film
The Double Deckers

Possibly living people
Year of birth missing (living people)
English film directors
English screenwriters
English male screenwriters
English film producers